Theophilus Fitzhardinge Campbell (1811-1894) was Dean of Dromore from 1887 to 1894.

He was educated at Trinity College, Dublin, graduating  in 1838; and his first post was a curacy  at Munterconnaught. He held incumbencies in Tunstall, Belfast and Finvoy. In 1886, he became Archdeacon of Dromore.

Notes

1811 births
1894 deaths
Alumni of Trinity College Dublin
Archdeacons of Dromore
Deans of Dromore